This is a list of English football transfers for the 2004–05 season. Only moves featuring at least one Premier League or First Division club are listed.

The winter transfer window opened on 1 January 2005, although a few transfers took place prior to that date. Players without a club may join one at any time, either during or in between transfer windows. Clubs below Premier League level may also sign players on loan at any time. If need be, clubs may sign a goalkeeper on an emergency loan, if all others are unavailable. Clubs are able to purchase players again in May when the window re-opens.

January transfers

1 January 2005
Jean-Alain Boumsong from Rangers to Newcastle United, £8m
3 January 2005
Celestine Babayaro from Chelsea to Newcastle United, Undisclosed
4 January 2005
James Beattie from Southampton to Everton, £6m
Jamie Redknapp from Spurs to Southampton, free
6 January 2005
Ryan Nelsen from Major League Soccer (D.C. United) to Blackburn Rovers, free
Jiri Jarosik from CSKA Moscow to Chelsea, Undisclosed
7 January 2005
Emmanuel Eboué from Beveren to Arsenal, £1.5m
10 January 2005
Dean Ashton from Crewe Alexandra to Norwich City, £3m
Kevin Campbell from Everton to West Brom, free
12 January 2005
Fernando Morientes from Real Madrid to Liverpool, £6.3m
14 January 2005
Thomas Gravesen from Everton to Real Madrid, £2.5m
15 January 2005
Kasey Keller from Spurs to Mönchengladbach, free
17 January 2005
Nigel Quashie from Portsmouth to Southampton, £2.1m
19 January 2005
Robbie Savage from Birmingham City to Blackburn Rovers, £3m
21 January 2005
Scott Carson from Leeds United to Liverpool, £1m
22 January 2005
Bernt Haas from West Brom to Bastia, free
25 January 2005
Amady Faye from Portsmouth to Newcastle United, £2m
27 January 2005
Mounir El Hamdaoui from Excelsior Rotterdam to Spurs, Undisclosed
28 January 2005
Mido from AS Roma to Spurs, two-season long loan
Stéphane Henchoz from Liverpool to Celtic, free
31 January 2005
Nicolas Anelka from Manchester City to Fenerbahçe, £7m
Eric Djemba-Djemba from Manchester United to Aston Villa, £1.35m
Mikel Arteta from Real Sociedad to Everton, six-month loan
Craig Bellamy from Newcastle United to Celtic, six-month loan
Barry Ferguson from Blackburn Rovers to Rangers, £4.5m
Olivier Bernard from Newcastle United to Southampton, Undisclosed
Vincent Candela from AS Roma to Bolton Wanderers, free
Jermaine Pennant from Arsenal to Birmingham City, six-month loan
Andy Reid from Nottingham Forest to Tottenham Hotspur, £4m
Michael Dawson from Nottingham Forest to Tottenham Hotspur, £4m

Post-window deals
17 April 2005
Dwight Yorke from Birmingham City to Sydney FC, free
25 April 2005
Jermaine Pennant from Arsenal to Birmingham City, £3m

Notes and references

External links

Trna
Football transfers winter 2004–05
Winter 2004-05